Kaare Gundersen (13 August 1909 – 13 February 1971) was a Norwegian boxer. He competed in the men's featherweight event at the 1948 Summer Olympics.

References

1909 births
1971 deaths
Norwegian male boxers
Olympic boxers of Norway
Boxers at the 1948 Summer Olympics
Sportspeople from Oslo
Featherweight boxers
20th-century Norwegian people